California Proposition 19 (2020), also referred to as Assembly Constitutional Amendment No. 11, is an amendment of the Constitution of California that was narrowly approved by voters in the general election on November 3, 2020, with just over 51% of the vote. The legislation increases the property tax burden on owners of inherited property to provide expanded property tax benefits to homeowners ages 55 years and older, disabled homeowners, and victims of natural disasters and fund wildfire response.  According to the California Legislative Analyst, Proposition 19 is a large net tax increase "of hundreds of millions of dollars per year."

According to the ballot summary, Proposition 19:

 Allows homeowners who are over 55 years of age (without regard to wealth), disabled, or victims of natural disasters to transfer their existing property tax assessed value under 1978 California Proposition 13 to a replacement home, including a more expensive home.
 Significantly limits the existing property tax benefits under Proposition 13 for certain real estate transfers between family members, such as the transfer of property from a parent to a child following the death of the parent.
 Expands property tax benefits for family farm transfers.
 Allocates net state (but not local) revenues and savings (if any) to wildfire response and for reimbursing local governments.  However, because the COVID-19 pandemic has created significant uncertainty for the state budget, the Legislative Analyst believes that the vast majority of the wildfire funding will not be available until 2025 at the earliest.

The proposition was sponsored and heavily promoted by the California Association of Realtors, and became effective on February 16, 2021.

Background 

The California Association of Realtors previously sponsored and financed an initiative measure known as 2018 California Proposition 5 on the November 2018 ballot that would have further expanded Proposition 13 property tax breaks for certain homeowners (primarily homeowners over age 55) by allowing them to transfer their lower property tax base to replacement property.  That ballot measure failed statewide with 40% support, and also failed to receive majority support in all 58 California counties.  Proposition 5 opponents successfully argued that the initiative measure was a "huge tax break to wealthy Californians" and a "huge windfall to the real estate industry."

In 2019, the California Association of Realtors sponsored and financed another initiative measure that would have expanded Proposition 13 property tax breaks for certain homeowners like the 2018 California Proposition 5 ballot measure.  However, to generate a net increase in property tax revenue, the initiative also significantly narrowed Proposition 13 property tax reassessment exclusion rules for inherited properties and expanded the scope of business entity ownership changes that would result in commercial property reassessment under Proposition 13.  This initiative measure received sufficient signatures to qualify for the November 2020 ballot.

Assembly Constitutional Amendment No. 11 (ACA 11) 

As allowed under California law, the California Association of Realtors negotiated with various special interests to secure legislative approval of an alternative constitutional amendment known as Assembly Constitutional Amendment No. 11 (ACA 11).  Proposition 19 was added to the ballot via ACA 11 which was authored by San Mateo Assemblymember Kevin Mullin.

Significant controversy arose because the legislative approval of ACA 11 missed the regular legal deadline for placing measures on the November 2020 ballot, and the Legislature also had to enact a separate statute calling a special election for ACA 11 that was consolidated with the regular November 2020 election.  In response to the approval and qualification of ACA 11 for the November 2020 ballot, the California Association of Realtors withdrew its 2019 initiative measure that was previously eligible to appear on the November 2020 ballot.   
The primary differences between Proposition 19 and the 2019 initiative measure withdrawn by the California Association of Realtors are that Proposition 19 excluded the expanded business entity ownership provisions that would have resulted in commercial property reassessment under Proposition 13 (to appease major business interests who did not like the business tax increase component of the 2019 initiative) and that Proposition 19 added the partial firefighting revenue provisions as a political sweetener (to appease firefighting organizations that previously opposed 2018 California Proposition 5).

Thus, compared to the 2019 initiative measure, Proposition 19 retained the expanded Proposition 13 property tax breaks for certain homeowners (primarily homeowners over age 55) like those contained in the defeated 2018 California Proposition 5 ballot measure, retained the property tax increase provisions by significantly narrowing Proposition 13 property tax reassessment exclusion rules for inherited properties, and added the partial firefighting revenue provisions as a political sweetener.

Legislative Votes on ACA 11 

In California, constitutional amendments proposed by the Legislature require approval from two-thirds of the membership of each house.

The following are the votes by the Members of the California Legislature on ACA 11, along with how the voters within the corresponding legislative district subsequently voted on Proposition 19:

California Assembly 

Assembly votes are from the California Assembly Daily Journal and Proposition 19 outcomes are from the California Secretary of State. The vote designation of "Abstain" is for those Legislators present on the day of the vote, but who did not record a vote for or against ACA 11. The vote designation of "Absent" is for those Legislators who were absent on the day of the vote. Assembly districts are based on the applicable 2011 district.

California Senate 

Senate votes are from the California Senate Daily Journal and Proposition 19 outcomes are from the California Secretary of State. The vote designation of "Abstain" is for those Legislators present on the day of the vote, but who did not record a vote for or against ACA 11. Senate districts are based on the applicable 2011 district.

Real estate industry sponsor and prior history 

The California Association of Realtors (C.A.R.) sponsored the Proposition 19 constitutional amendment; some of those opposed to Prop 19 have presumed that C.A.R. has done so with an expectation of increasing the number of home sales that might result, including from both the expanded tax benefit portability provisions and from the significant narrowing of the inheritance exclusion provisions which will make more home sales likely. The president of the California Association of Realtors has denied that Proposition 19 is about making money for the Realtors, but rather, to increase opportunities for buyers in a California housing market plagued in recent years by low inventory.

Racial equity issues 

In analyzing the Proposition 19 ballot measure, a September 2020 report by the California Budget & Policy Center stated that: "Housing policy and tax policy have historically benefited white households most, including through policies with explicitly racist design and implementation that have blocked Black and brown Californians from homeownership opportunities. By directing additional tax benefits largely to white homeowners, Prop. 19 reinforces racial inequity within California's tax system."

The Greenlining Institute has also criticized Proposition 19 for not helping "first-time homeowners who are disproportionately Black, Indigenous and people of color."

According to data from the Los Angeles County Assessor, the significant curtailment of the property tax inheritance exclusion under Proposition 19 would adversely impact many property owners in minority communities.  For example, significantly more property owners have claimed the property tax inheritance exclusion in the city of Compton than in the cities of Beverly Hills and Malibu combined.

Campaign controversy 

It was reported that the California Association of Realtors, the sponsor of Proposition 19, hired a former employee of a statewide taxpayer association for the sole purpose of using the former employer's job title to confuse voters to support Proposition 19.  A radio ad was cited in the article as being deceptive because the former employee led listeners to believe he was advocating for the Proposition 19 tax increase in his capacity as the former legislative director of the statewide taxpayers association.  The statewide taxpayers association received many calls from voters who said they were disgusted by the misleading radio ads and large direct mail pieces by the Yes on 19 campaign.  The reporting article also cited a California Globe analysis that Proposition 19 is a billion dollar tax increase on California families and that Proposition 19 was in fact opposed by the statewide taxpayers association.

Newspaper editorials 

According to the California Initiative Editorial Scorecard, Proposition 19 was opposed by 16 major California newspapers and supported by 5 major California newspapers.

The following major California newspapers opposed Proposition 19:

The following major California newspaper supported Proposition 19:

Campaign contributions 

According to campaign contribution data from the California Secretary of State, as of November 1, 2020, supporters of Proposition 19 raised $47.0 million, with $40.4 million from the California Association of Realtors and $4.9 million from the National Association of Realtors, for a combined total of $45.3 million (96.4% of all campaign contributions) coming from real estate interests.  Opponents of Proposition 19 raised approximately $45,000.

Polling 

In order to pass, Proposition 19 needed simple majority (>50%) approval by the voters which it narrowly received.

Notes

References 

2020 California ballot propositions
Taxation in California
Property taxes